Namer, means "leopard" and also a syllabic abbreviation of "Nagmash" (APC) and "Merkava", is an Israeli armoured personnel carrier based on a Merkava Mark IV tank chassis. Namer was developed by and is being assembled by the Israeli Ordnance Corps. It has entered service in limited numbers with the Israel Defense Forces since the end of 2008. However, as of 2014, still only very limited numbers of Namers were in service with the IDF. Due to budgetary constraints, the introduction of the Namer into the IDF has been slow, leaving the ground forces dependent on the M113 for many years to come.

They are more heavily armored than the Merkava IV tanks. According to the IDF, the Namer is the most heavily armored vehicle in the world of any type.

History

1990s–2004
The experience of converting Centurion tanks into armored personnel carriers (Nagmashot, Nagmachon) and combat engineering vehicles (Puma, Nakpadon), followed by the successful conversion of many T-54 and T-55 tanks into Achzarit infantry fighting vehicles pushed the idea of converting Merkava tanks into heavily armored APCs / IFVs. The concept held great promise, because many of the 250 Merkava Mark I tanks were being gradually withdrawn from service and it was also made clear that the 105 mm armament of the Merkava Mark IIs could not be upgraded to the more modern IMI 120 mm gun.

The development did not progress much in the 1990s due to lack of funds, but following 2004 Israel–Gaza conflict, which exposed the vulnerability of the M113 armored personnel carrier to improvised explosive devices and rocket-propelled grenades, the IDF re-opened the development. At that point the Stryker armored personnel carrier was offered and rejected by the IDF.

2005–present
Eventually, IDF Ordnance developed infantry fighting vehicle prototypes based on the Merkava Mark I chassis, and also a handful of IFVs based on the Merkava Mark IV chassis. The vehicle was initially called Nemmera (Hebrew: leopardess), but later renamed to Namer (Hebrew: leopard), while the name Nemmera refers to a Merkava-based ARV.

On 15 February 2005, Maariv reported that a running Namer prototype based on the Merkava Mark I was fielded by the Givati Brigade for trials and evaluation. It was equipped with a Rafael Overhead Weapon Station, which is remotely controlled and loaded from within the vehicle. This same unit was demonstrated at the Eurosatory 2005 military exhibition where prospective export customers showed interest.

Lessons learned in the battles of the 2006 Lebanon War also largely validated this program. Consequently, in 2007 it was reported that the first fifteen Namers would be delivered in 2008, and over a hundred more would finally equip two combat brigades. However, conversion plans were abandoned in favor of newly built Merkava Mark IV chassis.

The Namer was the first IDF vehicle designed by computer, which allowed the vehicle to be designed more rapidly than previous vehicles.

On 1 March 2008, an operational, started from scratch and fully developed Namer IFV based on Merkava Mark IV chassis was officially presented by the IDF. Reportedly, the construction was expedited in May 2008 by importing parts from the US. On 15 September 2008, the Namer was unveiled to the general public at an exhibition in Rishon LeZion.

To speed up the production of the Namers (which have been taking place domestically) on 25 October 2010, it was announced that General Dynamics Land Systems had been chosen to negotiate a contract to manufacture and integrate an unspecified number of vehicle hulls at the Joint Systems Manufacturing Center in Lima, Ohio.

After cutting back orders for the Namer in 2014 due to budget constraints, in 2015 the IDF increased its orders for parts, in expectation of orders of complete systems. The move is in part a response to the death of 7 Golani Brigade soldiers who were killed by an RPG in Gaza while riding a Vietnam War-era M113 whose engine stalled in the middle of the battlefield. The orders from General Dynamics are occurring alongside domestic production of the vehicles.

It was originally planned to be equipped with Israel Military Industries's Iron Fist active protection system; however, due to budget limitations the installation of an active protection system has been delayed. From 2016, nearly a decade later than planned, the IDF said that it will begin to fit newly built Namers with Rafael's Trophy active protection system.

Budgetary constraints and lack of prioritization of ground forces have meant that the IDF continuously cut back its orders of the Namer. As of 2014, the pace of Namer purchases was still considered slow, with around 30 being produced each year, meaning that there would not be 500 of the vehicles in the IDF until 2027.

On 6 March 2016, the Jerusalem Post reported that all new Namers would be delivered with the Trophy active protection system. They also reported that the quantity ordered had been doubled from the previous year.

At the end of 2016, the IDF Combat Engineering Corps started to operate the Namer CEV (Hebrew: נמ"ר הנדסי – נמר"ה). The Namer CEV is equipped with Trophy active protection system and engineering devices such as mine rollers, bulldozer blades and anti-mine CARPET rockets.

Design

Survivability
Namer has been designed for survivability and rapid repair, with modular armor, V-hull belly armor pack, and CBRN defense.

According to Brigadier general Yaron Livnat, they are more heavily armored than the Merkava IV tanks: "The weight saved by eliminating the turret was 'reinvested' in beefing up the armor."

From 2016 onwards, it is planned for some of them to begin to be equipped with a Trophy active protection system.

Israel's defense ministry stated in 2015: "The Namer is considered to be the most protected armored combat vehicle in the world, which proved its abilities during fighting in Operation Protective Edge against many threats." As a result, it plans to introduce more of the vehicles into the army over the next decade, to replace the M113s currently in service.

Armament
Namer is armed with either a M2 Browning machine gun or a Mk 19 grenade launcher mounted on a Samson Remote Controlled Weapon Station as well as a 7.62 mm (FN MAG) machine gun and a 60 mm mortar. Smoke grenade launchers are also carried.

On 31 July 2017, the Israeli Defense Ministry released video of an infantry fighting vehicle version of the Namer fitted with an unmanned turret armed with a 30 mm cannon; the turret is equipped with the Trophy APS. The Namer IFV offers more firepower for infantry units and provides a better response in urban combat operations.

On 12 December 2018, the Israeli Defense ministry released a further video of the IFV version of the Namer launching two Spike-MR missiles from a pod which can be erected from and lowered flush into the turret roof. A defense ministry spokesperson stated the installation "will enable IDF soldiers to fire missiles from within the vehicles, while they are still protected, which will significantly increase the attack range of the vehicles". The automated launch pod will also be fitted to the turret of the Eitan AFV.

Capabilities

Namer is capable of maneuvering in difficult terrain, powered by the Teledyne Continental AVDS-1790-9AR  V12 air-cooled diesel engine of the Merkava Mark III. Namer is able to carry up to 12 troops (crewmen and fully equipped infantrymen) and one stretcher, or two stretchers and medical equipment on a Namerbulance MEDEVAC version. The original Merkava Mark IV rear entrance was redesigned to be a wider door ramp with a sniper port. Two hatches are fitted on the roof, which is higher than Merkava's hull roof. Namer also shares a digital battlefield management system with Merkava Mark IV, giving it hunter-killer team capabilities.

Namer CEV 

On 13 April 2016, the Israeli Defense Ministry released video and photos of combat engineering versions of the Namer undergoing testing.  There are three combat engineering derivatives: a bulldozer version to be operated by company commanders; a breaching and obstacle bridging version to be operated by platoon commanders; and a towing version to be operated by platoon sergeants. Additional engineering devices, such as CARPET mine-breaching rockets, can be installed per mission. Combat engineering Namers are equipped with the Trophy APS, and would endow brigade-level teams with capabilities they never had before to deal with tunnels, bridge obstacles, and maneuver in high-threat areas. The Namer CEV entered service in the end 2016, at Battalion 603 of the Combat Engineering Corps, and is projected to enter service of the 601st Battalion in 2021.

Combat history 

Namers took part in Operation Protective Edge. During the fighting, Namers (which at the time were not fitted with Active and Soft Protection Systems) were hit multiple times by RPGs and ATGMs, including suffering direct hits by 9M133 Kornet ATGMs, but the vehicles emerged undamaged and in no instances was the armor penetrated or injuries caused. In another case, an explosive charge weighing half a ton to a ton of explosives was detonated near the Namer, and a house collapsed on the APC, nothing happened to it and the soldiers, continued their mission as planned. As a result of its success on the battlefield, there were calls for the number of vehicles to be increased (beyond the 170 on order), and for them to gradually replace the many M113s currently fielded by IDF combat units.

Users
  – According to IDF, the Namer IFV is set be distributed to infantry and combat engineering forces, with possible future plans for special models for intelligence and command purposes. Two Namers took part in the Gaza War as part of the Golani Brigade. By 2014, there were up to 120 Namers in service, and they took part in Operation Protective Edge. The Namer CEV (combat engineering vehicle) entered service in the end of 2016.

Export proposals

  – Azerbaijan and Israel have conducted negotiations over the Namer vehicle.
  – Israel has offered procurement of Namer APCs to Colombia.
  – The U.S. Army conducted non-developmental vehicle operational assessments of current combat vehicles in 2012 to evaluate capabilities against requirements for purchase of a new IFV for the Ground Combat Vehicle program. One of the vehicles validated was the Namer. In April 2013, the Congressional Budget Office released a report that advised purchasing current vehicles instead of developing a new vehicle for the GCV program. Buying the Namer would cost $9 billion less, and meet the required nine-man carrying capacity. The Army responded by saying that although the Namer and other vehicles assessed in 2012 met some GCV requirements, no currently fielded vehicle met enough without needing significant redesign.

See also
 Nagmachon
Achzarit
 Nakpadon
 Ajax
 Griffin III
 Lynx KF41
 Puma
 T-15 Armata
 Tulpar
 VN20
 BTR-T
 BMPT

References

External links

 Namer on Armour.ws
 Namer AIFV on Defense-Update.com
 Namer on military-today.com
 Namer Family + Merkava Family
 Namer prototype and operational Namer on israeli-weapons.com
 Namer heavy armoured personnel carrier on Jane's
 IDF ARMOR blog: Namer APC on Merkava chassis
 Namer Armoured vehicle infantry personnel carrier on armyrecognition.com
 Namer video on YouTube
 First exercise (Hebrew)

Armoured personnel carriers of Israel
Tracked armoured personnel carriers
Military vehicles introduced in the 2000s